Jamie Craig Langenbrunner (born July 24, 1975) is an American former professional ice hockey player. Langenbrunner was formerly the captain of the 2010 United States Olympic Team, a member of the 1999 Dallas Stars' Stanley Cup championship team and the 2003 New Jersey Devils' Stanley Cup championship team.

Playing career

Junior
In high school, Langenbrunner played for the Cloquet Lumberjacks in the Minnesota State High School Hockey League.

After scoring 148 points in 70 games during his freshmen, sophomore and junior years in high school and leading the Lumberjacks to back-to-back State Tournament appearances, Langenbrunner was named the AP's Minnesota High School Hockey Player of the Year. Following a spectacular State Tournament performance, Langenbrunner was drafted out of Cloquet 35th overall in the 1993 NHL Entry Draft by the Dallas Stars.

Langenbrunner would then forego playing his senior year of high school hockey and instead play his next two seasons with the Peterborough Petes of the Ontario Hockey League (OHL), scoring 75 goals and 115 assists for 190 points in only 124 games. He additionally tallied 12 goals and 20 assists for 32 points in 18 playoff games. In his second year in Peterborough (during the 1994–95 season), he made his NHL debut with the Dallas Stars.

Professional
The following year, during the 1995–96 season, he played 59 games with the Michigan K-Wings of the IHL, scoring 25 goals and notching 40 assists for 65 points while tallying 13 points in 10 playoff games. His impressive numbers earned him the team's MVP award and also got him called up to the NHL, where he played 12 games that year.

Dallas Stars
Langenbrunner made his NHL debut on April 9, 1995, skating with Dallas in a game against the St. Louis Blues, but he did not become an NHL regular until the 1996–97 season, when he played 76 games and scored 39 points playing on the left wing. For his strong first-year efforts, he was named a candidate for the Calder Memorial Trophy, given annually to the NHL's Rookie of the Year. Langenbrunner, however, was ultimately edged-out by Bryan Berard of the New York Islanders for the honor.

During the 1997–98 season, Langenbrunner reached the 20-goal plateau, scoring 23 goals and 29 assists for 52 points while playing in 81 games. That year, Langenbrunner also represented his country at the 1998 Winter Olympics, though the Americans fell short of winning a medal.

In the 1998–99 season, Langenbrunner played in 75 games, scoring 12 goals and adding 33 assists for 45 total points. However, his real breakthrough came in the playoffs that year, where he scored 10 goals and had 17 points while winning his and Dallas' first Stanley Cup over the Buffalo Sabres. He was third in scoring for the Stars, behind Mike Modano and that year's Conn Smythe Trophy winner, Joe Nieuwendyk.

New Jersey Devils

On March 19, 2002, Langenbrunner was traded with Joe Nieuwendyk to the New Jersey Devils for Jason Arnott, Randy McKay and a first-round draft pick. The next season, in 2002–03, Langenbrunner had a then career-best 22 goals and 33 assists for 55 points in 78 games for the Devils. He continued his scoring numbers in the playoffs, leading the league in goals (11) and points (18) en route to his second Stanley Cup in a 4–3 series victory versus the Mighty Ducks of Anaheim.

After both an injury-plagued season in 2003–04 in which Langenbrunner played only 53 games and the NHL's lockout season in 2004–05, Langenbrunner bounced back strongly in 2005–06, scoring 53 points in 80 games. He again had a strong playoff performance, scoring 13 points in nine games before the Devils lost to the eventual Stanley Cup champion Carolina Hurricanes in the Conference Semi-finals.

On July 1, 2006, signed a five-year, $14 million contract extension with the Devils worth an annual average of $2.8 million.

During the 2006–07 season, Langenbrunner scored a career-best 60 points, where he also played in all 82 games that season, scoring 23 goals and adding 37 assists (both career bests). In the 2007 playoffs, Langenbrunner again played well, scoring eight points in 11 games before losing to the Stanley Cup Finals-bound Ottawa Senators.

On December 5, 2007, Langenbrunner was named captain of the New Jersey Devils. That year, however, Langenbrunner missed nearly 20 games to a groin injury and his stats dipped as he scored 41 points in 64 games. In the playoffs, the Devils lost in the first round to the New York Rangers 4–1, though Langenbrunner played well, scoring four points in the short series.

Beginning in the 2007–08 season, Langenbrunner played on a line with teammates Zach Parise and Travis Zajac. The line was dubbed "ZZ Pops" due to the difference in age between the veteran and the two youngsters who have initials with the letter "Z."

In January 2009, Langenbrunner scored two goals in each of three consecutive games, including three game winners for the Devils. Two of those game-winning goals were scored in overtime. His streak of three consecutive multi-goal games with a game-winning goal was last accomplished by Wayne Gretzky during the 1981–82 season. Langenbrunner played extremely well in the second half of the season and went on to set career highs in goals (29) assists (40) points (69) and plus-minus rating (+25).  Langenbrunner, along with fellow linemates Zach Parise and Travis Zajac, all had remarkable seasons, as the line combined for 94 goals and 131 assists for a total of 225 points as well as having a combined plus-minus of +88.

On January 2, 2010, Langenbrunner scored the first hat-trick of his career while playing against the Minnesota Wild in his home state of Minnesota as the Devils defeated the Wild 5–3.

Return to Dallas
On January 7, 2011, Langenbrunner was traded to the Dallas Stars for a conditional third-round pick in the 2011 NHL Entry Draft.  The pick would become a second-round pick if the Stars either win a playoff round or re-sign Langenbrunner before the draft. Langenbrunner would score his first goal in his return as a Star in his 1,000th career game, which was against the Los Angeles Kings on January 17, 2011, as the Stars defeated the Kings 2–1.

St. Louis Blues
Langenbrunner signed a one-year contract as a free agent with the St. Louis Blues on July 6, 2011. In his first season with the Blues, in 2011–12, Langenbrunner added depth to the team and was used primarily as a checking line forward, scoring six goals and 24 points in 70 games. He was re-signed to a one-year extension with St. Louis on July 10, 2012.

In the lockout-shortened 2012–13 campaign, Langenbrunner participated in only four games with the Blues, posting one assist before an ongoing torn labrum in his left hip required season-ending surgery on February 9, 2013.

Retirement
On January 15, 2014, Langenbrunner announced his retirement after 16 seasons in the NHL. He joined the Boston Bruins on September 12, 2015, as the team's player development coach.

Personal life
Jamie was born in Duluth, Minnesota, in 1975; the family lived in Moose Lake, Minnesota, at the time. When he was one, the family moved for a short time to Moorhead before moving to International Falls in 1979. Langenbrunner was well into his skating career by age five. They moved to Cloquet in 1985.

Langenbrunner married his high school sweetheart, Elizabeth, and together they have three children: daughter Laine (born 1998), and sons Landon (born 2000) and Mason (born 2002). Mason was drafted 151st overall in the 2020 NHL Entry Draft by the Boston Bruins. While with the Devils, Langenbrunner lived in North Caldwell, New Jersey.  Langenbrunner and his family live in his home state of Minnesota.

Awards and achievements
1995–96 IHL Michigan K-Wings MVP
1998 Member of the United States Olympic Hockey team
1998–99 NHL Stanley Cup Champion (Dallas Stars)
2002–03 NHL Stanley Cup Champion (New Jersey Devils)
2002–03 NHL Stanley Cup Playoffs Scoring Champion (New Jersey Devils)
2002–03 NHL Stanley Cup Playoffs Most Goals (11) (New Jersey Devils)
2007–2011 New Jersey Devils Team Captain
January 2009 NHL Player of the Month
Named Captain of 2010 United States Olympic Hockey team
2010 Winter Olympic Silver Medalist – Men's Ice Hockey

Career statistics

Regular season and playoffs

International

See also
 List of NHL players with 1,000 games played

References

2005 NHL Official Guide & Record Book

External links
 

1975 births
Living people
American men's ice hockey right wingers
Boston Bruins coaches
Dallas Stars draft picks
Dallas Stars players
ERC Ingolstadt players
Ice hockey players from Minnesota
Ice hockey players at the 1998 Winter Olympics
Ice hockey players at the 2010 Winter Olympics
Kalamazoo Wings (1974–2000) players
Medalists at the 2010 Winter Olympics
New Jersey Devils players
Olympic silver medalists for the United States in ice hockey
People from Cloquet, Minnesota
People from North Caldwell, New Jersey
Peterborough Petes (ice hockey) players
St. Louis Blues players
Stanley Cup champions